The Marché aux fleurs Reine-Elizabeth-II is a flower market in Paris.  It was formerly known as the Marché aux fleurs et aux oiseaux Cité but was renamed for Queen Elizabeth II after a state visit in 2014.

It sells caged birds on Sundays but this trade has been forbidden on the grounds of animal welfare and so is expected to cease after a period of renovation and reorganisation scheduled from 2023 to 2025.

References

Flower markets
Retail markets in Paris